Mykola Mykolayovych Arkas (born 7 January 1853, Mykolaiv – 26 September 1909, Mykolaiv) was a Ukrainian composer, writer, historian, and cultural activist. Arkas was the author of a popular book History of Ukraine (1908) and his most notable composition was the opera "Kateryna".

Biography 

His grandfather Andreas Arkas (1766–1825),  son of an Orthodox priest from Patras, was invited to teach classical languages and history in Nikolayev   Naval   School,   Russia. He   spoke   12   languages   and   had   published corresponding  dictionaries. He  moved  with  his  family  to  Russia  with  the  help  of  the Ecumenical  Patriarchate  of Constantinople. Mykola  Arkas  was  a  son  of  the  Russian Admiral,  Chief  Commander  of  the  Black  Sea  Fleet  and  Ports,  a  founder  of  steam navigation  and  trade  on  the  Black  Sea  and  a founder  of  Caspian  Sea  Fleet,  Nikolay Andreyevich Arkas (1816–1881) and the Ukrainian Sophia Bogdanovich.

Mykola received his all-round education in the Law School of St. Petersburg and completed his studies in physics and mathematics at the University of Odessa. After completing his studies (1875–1881), in accordance with the family tradition, he joined the Imperial Russian Navy.

Upon completion of naval service in 1881 Arkas obtained a magistracy in Kherson. In his leisure time, he collected and recorded folk songs, also studying the history of Ukraine. His teacher, Petro Nishchynsky, who was a Ukrainian composer, conductor, and writer, had an influence upon Mykola; the latter tried to master musical knowledge independently, to develop his composer's skills and writing music.

Compositions and other cultural activities 

Arkas's artistic contributions include about 80 compositions for solo-singing, vocal ensembles and arrangements of folk songs. His opera "Kateryna" (1890) is the most significant work of Mykola Arkas, adapted as from Taras Shevchenko's poem of the same title. This work brought recognition to Mykola Arkas and became the first Ukrainian lyrical folk opera. Performances of "Kateryna" were a great success, first playing in Moscow by Mark Kropivnitskiy's troupe in 1899, and later in Minsk, Vilnius and Kiev.

Arkas was the founder and chairman of the "Prosvita" cultural and educational society in Mykolaiv. At his own expense he opened a public school that taught in Ukrainian, as the dominant teaching language in schools was Russian.

In 1908 in St. Petersburg, a book by Mykola Arkas — "History of Ukraine-Rus" — was published under the editorship of Ukrainian writer Vasyl Domaniczky. The book was written in Ukrainian.

Commemoration 

 In October 1992 in Myoklaiv there was open a monument to Mykola Arkas (by sculptor O.Zdykhovskiy)
 In 2003 a postage stamp was released in Ukraine dedicated to Mykola Arkas

Bibliography 
 Arkas, M. History of Ukraine-Rus. "Obshchestvennaia Polza" Association. 1908.
 Dytyniak Maria  Ukrainian Composers – A Bio-bibliographic Guide – Research report No. 14, 1896, Canadian Institute of Ukrainian Studies, University of Alberta, Canada.
 Kaufman L. M. M.  – Arkas – Narys pro zhyttia i tvorchist', Kiev, 1958.

External links 

 Mykola Arkas – Encyclopedia of Ukraine

References 

1853 births
1909 deaths
Musicians from Mykolaiv
Ukrainian people of Greek descent
Ukrainian classical composers
Greek classical composers
20th-century Ukrainian historians
Prosvita
Writers from Mykolaiv